The Star (season 9) was the ninth season of The Star, a Thailand based singing competition produced by Exact, a GMM Grammy Company.  Preliminary auditions took place during November to December in 2012. Original broadcast was on Modernine TV, began on 19 January 2013.  The season concluded on 28 April 2013, with "Tum - Warawut Poyim" winning the competition.

Preliminary auditions

Contestants

NO.1 Delilian Alford
 Nickname - Dee
 Birthday - 12 September 1997
Website -http://www.deethestar9.com

NO.2 Korakot Tunkaew
 Nickname - Aon
 Birthday - 1 July 1991
Website -http://www.aonthestar9.com

NO.3 Tanyaboon Wongwasin
 Nickname - Boon
 Birthday - 11 September 1990
Website -http://www.boonthestar.com

NO.4 Christopher Jonathan Roy Chaafe
 Nickname - Chris
 Birthday - 10 August 1994
Website -

NO.5 Sirinsopit Pachimsawat
 Nickname - Bambi
 Birthday - 15 September 1992
Website -http://www.bambithestar.com

NO.6 Nutjaree Horvejkul
 Nickname - Cherreen
 Birthday - 20 October 1994
Website -http://www.cherreenhvk.com

NO.7 Nattapong Promsing
 Nickname - Dew
 Birthday - 31 October 1992
Website -http://www.dewthestar.com & http://www.dewmayer.com

NO.8 Warawut Poyim
 Nickname - Tum
 Birthday - 14 December 1993
Website -http://www.tumthestar9.com

Eliminated Chart

  Male
  Female

  Green number indicate the 100 vote in studio highest score for each week.
 Red number indicate the 100 vote in studio lowest score for each week.
  indicates the Contestants eliminated that week.
  indicates the returning Contestants  that finished in the bottom two.
  indicates the winner of the competition.
  indicates the runner-up of the competition.

Call-out order

Red number indicate the 100 vote in studio lowest score for each week.
 Green number indicate the 100 vote in studio highest score for each week.
 The contestant was eliminated
  indicates the winner of the competition.
  indicates the runner-up of the competition.

The Star (TV series)
2013 Thai television seasons